This is a list of tallest buildings in Richmond, Virginia. Presently, the tallest building in Richmond is the 29-story James Monroe Building. It was the tallest building in Virginia from the time of its completion in 1981 until 2007, when the 38-story Westin Tower in Virginia Beach opened in downtown Virginia Beach. The second-tallest building in the city is 600 Canal Place at 417 feet in height. The next three tallest skyscrapers each have 26 stories within the structure, although they vary in height. The SunTrust Plaza stands at 400 ft (120 m), while the Federal Reserve Bank of Richmond, which also has 26 stories stands at 394 ft (119 m). The third tallest building is the Bank of America Center which stands at 331 ft (101 m).

Typically, the first high-rise in Richmond history is often considered to be the 19-story BB&T Bank Building, which was completed in 1913. The structure stands at 262 ft (80 m) and is located in Downtown Richmond.

The newest high rises in Richmond include Brandt Hall, a 17-story college dorm on the Monroe Park campus of Virginia Commonwealth University, which was completed in 2005, along the Vistas on the James, which were completed that same year. Additionally, in downtown, the 12-story MWV Building was completed in 2010.  The 23-story Central National Bank Building, built in 1930, is being converted into apartments after being left abandoned for over 20 years.  A new 18-story office building named "Gateway Plaza", was constructed downtown for the McGuire Woods law firm and completed in December, 2015.  The newest building is the 20-story 600 Canal Place building, a 417-foot tower serving as Dominion Energy’s headquarters, which was completed in 2019. The former Dominion Energy tower, One James River Plaza, was initially demolished in May 2020 to make room for 700 Canal Place. However, in April 2021, Dominion Energy announced that plans for the smaller twin tower aren't coming to fruition.

Tallest buildings

Timeline of tallest buildings

Tallest under construction, approved and proposed 
This lists buildings that are under construction, approved for construction or proposed for construction in Richmond and are planned to rise at least , but are not yet completed structures. Under construction buildings that have already been topped out are also included.

* Table entries with dashes (—) indicate that information regarding building heights, floor counts, or dates of completion has not yet been released.

See also
 List of tallest buildings in Virginia

References

"Tallest Buildings in Richmond." Emporis.com. Accessed

 
Tallest in Richmond
Richmond, Virginia